The Festival of Seven Herbs or Nanakusa no sekku is the long-standing Japanese custom of eating seven-herb rice porridge (七草粥, nanakusa-gayu, lit. "7 Herbs Rice-Congee") on January 7 (Jinjitsu); one of the Gosekku.

History
The seventh of the first month has been an important Japanese festival since ancient times. Jingchu Suishiji, written in the Six Dynasties China, recorded the Southern Chinese custom of eating a hot soup that contains seven vegetables to bring longevity and health and ward off evil on the 7th day of the first month of the Chinese calendar. Since there is little green at that time of the year, the young green herbs bring color to the table and eating them suits the spirit of the New Year. The custom was present in Taiwan until the mid-Qing Dynasty, and is still present in parts of rural Guangdong province.

Seven spring flowers
The nanakusa, or more specifically, haru no nanakusa, spring's seven flowers (or herbs), are seven edible wild herbs of spring. Traditionally, they are:

There is considerable variation in the precise ingredients, with common local herbs often being substituted.

On the morning of January 7, or the night before, people place the nanakusa, rice scoop, and/or wooden pestle on the cutting board and, facing the good-luck direction, chant "Before the birds of the continent (China) fly to Japan, let's get nanakusa" while cutting the herbs into pieces. The chant may vary from place to place.

Musical accompaniment

Seven autumn flowers

The spring-time nanakusa are mirrored by aki no nanakusa, meaning autumn's seven flowers. They are listed below:

The seven flowers of autumn are bush clover (hagi), miscanthus (obana, Miscanthus sinensis), kudzu, large pink (nadeshiko, Dianthus superbus), yellow-flowered valerian (ominaeshi, Patrinia scabiosifolia), boneset (fujibakama, Eupatorium fortunei), and Chinese bellflower (kikyō, Platycodon gradiflorus). These seven autumn flowers provide visual enjoyment. Their simplicity was very much admired: they are small and dainty yet beautifully colored. They are named as typical autumn flowers in a verse from the Man'yōshū anthology.

Unlike their spring counterparts, there is no particular event to do anything about the seven flowers of autumn. The autumn flowers are not intended for picking or eating, but for appreciation, despite each one is believed to have medical efficacy in traditional Chinese medicine. Tanka and haiku theming hanano (lit. flower field), meaning fields where the autumn wildflowers are in full bloom, have a centuries-old history.

Cautionary note
The Japanese parsley (Oenanthe javanica) species of the Oenanthe (water dropworts) genus is closely related to and easily confused with toxic water hemlock. Although accidental poisoning is rare, caution should be exercised when dealing with oenanthe species.  As Oenanthe javanica is not found outside of Asia unless specifically cultivated, wild-growing varieties of water dropworts should be considered lethal, even in small amounts.

References

External links
Taamchai
Japanese Culture: Jinjitsu (人日)
春の七草：チームウソ八百：So-net blog

New Year in Japan